The Dry Land, or American Tragic, is an American drama film, directed and written by Ryan Piers Williams. It opened worldwide on July 30, 2010.

Plot

James returns from Iraq to face a new battle readjusting to small-town life in Texas. His wife, his mother, and his friend provide support, but they cannot fully understand the pain and suffering he feels since his tour of duty ended. Lonely, James reconnects with an army buddy, Raymond, who provides him with compassion and friendship during his battle to process his experiences in Iraq. But their reunion also exposes the different ways that war affects people, at least on the surface.

Cast
America Ferrera as Sarah
Jason Ritter as Michael
Ethan Suplee as Jack
Wilmer Valderrama as Raymond Gonzales
Melissa Leo as Martha
June Diane Raphael as Susie
Evan Jones as Joe Davis
Ana Claudia Talancón as Adriana
Sasha Spielberg as Sally
Ryan O'Nan as James
Barry Shabaka Henley as Colonel Stephen Evans
Benito Martinez as David Valdez
Diego Klattenhoff as Henry
Misty Upham as Gloria
Jenny Gabrielle as Tina
Jeremiah Bitsui as Luis

Reception
The film received generally mixed to positive reviews. Review aggregator Rotten Tomatoes reports that 64% of 25 critics gave the film a positive review, with a rating average of 5.52/10. Metacritic, which assigns a weighted average score out of 100 to reviews from mainstream critics, gives the film a score of 47 based on 10 reviews signifying "mixed or average reviews".

Entertainment Weekly gave the film a "B" grade and praised Ryan O'Nan's "quietly riveting performance as an Iraq-war veteran who comes undone after he returns home to dusty Texas (the filmmaker's home turf)".

The film received Imagen Awards nominations for best feature film and for America Ferrera as best actress.

References

External links
 Official website
 
 
 
 
 

2010 films
2010 drama films
American drama films
Films about veterans
2010s English-language films
2010s American films